Abdoul Thiam (born 19 June 1976 in Berlin) is a German footballer who currently plays for Hilalspor Berlin in the 7th tier Landesliga Berlin Staffel 1.

At the height of his career, Thiam played 73 games for Eintracht Braunschweig and Rot Weiss Ahlen in the 2. Fußball-Bundesliga.

References 
 

1976 births
Living people
Footballers from Berlin
German footballers
Association football defenders
2. Bundesliga players
Hertha BSC II players
Eintracht Braunschweig players
Rot Weiss Ahlen players
SV Darmstadt 98 players
Tennis Borussia Berlin players